Hatton Castle may refer to:

Hatton Castle, Aberdeenshire
Hatton Castle, Angus